Woodcreek High School is one of many schools in the Roseville Joint Union High School District. This school is located at 2551 Woodcreek Oaks Bl. in Roseville, California, United States. Woodcreek has over 2,100 students.

History 

Woodcreek High School was established in 1994. When it opened it served as a high school for Roseville and the surrounding area in the newer section of the town. As the population of Placer County increased, many schools were assigned to the Roseville Joint Union High School District. It is one of the six (the other five being Roseville High, Oakmont High, Antelope High, Granite Bay High, and West Park High) common high schools in the Roseville Joint Union High School District.

Notable alumni
Dominic Sandoval, dancer
Steven Anderson, founder of Faithful Word Baptist Church and the New Independent Fundamentalist Baptist movement
Stephen Nogosek, MLB pitcher for the New York Mets
 Clarissa Thibeaux, Actor, series regular on Runaways (TV series) on HULU
 Kyle Jaeger, Journalist, Marijuana Moment, ATTN:, VICE Media, The Hollywood Reporter

References

Public high schools in California
Buildings and structures in Roseville, California
1994 establishments in California
Educational institutions established in 1994
High schools in Placer County, California